Nita Landry (born Chenita Marie Landry), better known as Dr. Nita, is an American obstetrician, gynecologist, author, and television correspondent. She co-hosted The Doctors from 2016 to 2020, and has made recurring appearances on several national television shows. Landry is a contributor to several women's interest magazines and is a frequent speaker at public engagements related to women's health and public education.

Early life and career
Landry was born in Alexandria, Louisiana, and attended Dillard University. She is a graduate of Peabody Magnet High School. After graduating summa cum laude with a bachelor's degree in biology, Landry continued her studies at the University of South Alabama, where she earned her medical degree. Landry completed her OB/GYN residency at the University of Louisville.

After completing her training and becoming a board-certified obstetrician and gynecologist, Landry chose to practice medicine as a travelling doctor, rather than taking a traditional role in an established practice. Landry traveled the US performing vaginal deliveries, gynecological surgeries, and working in clinics. She cared for women from a variety of backgrounds, including disadvantaged youth, women in domestic violence situations, and teenage mothers.

Television career
Since 2016, Landry co-hosted the daytime talk show The Doctors from 2016 to 2020. Landry, along with Travis Stork and three other panelists, left The Doctors on September 12, 2020, after the show changed to a single host format featuring Ian K. Smith. She has appeared on other shows as a medical expert, including Home and Family, Dr. Phil, Today, Access Hollywood, Inside Edition, Good Day L.A., Essence Now's "Health Myths Busted", and Iyanla: Fix My Life. Landry has also appeared on BET and CBS News.

Other work
Landry is a Fellow of the American College of Obstetricians and Gynecologists and an active speaker at public engagements. Landry is committed to educating teens and young adults about issues related to women's health. Landry has addressed topics related to sexual and reproductive health at events like the "Brain Food" lecture series, the 2019 Women's Health Expo, and LadyLike Day at UCLA in 2017. Landry was also an ambassador for National Women's Health Week in 2018 and 2019. Landry is a regular contributor to women's interest magazines such as Women's Health, Cosmopolitan, Shape, Self, Essence, and Parents.

Selected publications
‘’’Multislice Display of the Fetal Face Using 3‐Dimensional Ultrasonography’’’

References

External links
 Dr. Nita Official Website
  Nita Landry on IMDb

Living people
American television hosts
American women television presenters
American gynecologists
American women physicians
Physicians from California
CBS News people
Year of birth missing (living people)
21st-century American women